Queen Ti Memenne of La Gonâve (also written as Timemenne; 19th-century – fl. 1929) was the tribal ruler of La Gonâve, a Haitian island located west of Hispaniola in the Gulf of Gonâve. While her reign was not officially recognized by the republican government of Haiti during American occupation, she maintained political, economic, spiritual, and social leadership of the island. Arrested by the Garde d'Haiti for being a practitioner of Vodou, she was shown compassion by Faustin E. Wirkus, an American military officer who assisted in her release. She later proclaimed Wirkus to be the reincarnation of former Haitian Emperor Faustin Soulouque and crowned him as a co-ruler over La Gonâve.

Biography 
Ti Memenne was a leading figure over a group of matriarchal societies, dominating social and economic affairs on La Gonâve. Her reign over La Gonâve was not officially recognized by the republican government, which had abolished the monarchy and nobility in Haiti. Despite this, she was viewed by the other native people of the island as their political and spiritual leader.

As a young woman, Ti Memenne was captured by American military officials during the United States occupation of Haiti and charged with "trivial voodoo offenses." She received aid from Faustin E. Wirkus, an American sergeant serving in the Garde d'Haiti who had been stationed on La Gonâve. Wirkus sent her to Port-au-Prince with a recommendation for lenient treatment. For the next year Ti Memenne built a friendship with Wirkus, who advised her on governmental and civil matters. Due to his help, and because he shared a name with the former Haitian emperor Faustin I, she and her people proclaimed Wirkus to be Faustin II in a Vodou ritual, allowing him to co-rule over La Gonâve with her for three years (1926 – 1929). She reportedly believed Wirkus to be Faustin I's reincarnation.

In popular culture 
Ti Memenne is remembered in William Seabrook's 1929 novel The Magic Island and Wirkus' memoir The White King of La Gonave: The True Story of the Sergeant of Marines Who Was Crowned King on a Voodoo Island.

References 

19th-century Haitian people
19th-century monarchs in North America
19th-century women rulers
20th-century Haitian women
20th-century monarchs in North America
20th-century women rulers
Haitian prisoners and detainees
Haitian religious leaders
Haitian Vodou practitioners
Haitian women in politics
Monarchs of Haiti
People from Ouest (department)
Queens regnant
Republic of Haiti (1859–1957)
Year of birth missing
Year of death missing
Nobility of the Americas